The P.S.R. Rengasamy College of Engineering is run by P.S. Rengasamy  Education and Charitable Trust. The college is approved by AICTE, New Delhi and affiliated to Anna University, Chennai.

History

The college was established by the sons of P.S. Ramasamy Naidu to promote engineering education in the underdeveloped area of Virudhunagar District. The institution is in a sprawling area of about 20 acres of land on Sivakasi-Sankarankoil road amidst Sevalpatti and Thiruvengadam. It is 28 km from Kovilpatti and 26 km from Sivakasi town.

At the beginning, the principal was Dr. K.R. Viswanathan (2008–2011). Currently,

 Principal: Dr. K. Ramasamy
 Chairman: Thiru. R. Ramdass
 Correspondent: Thiru. R. Solaisamy
 Directors: R. Sundar and R. Arun

Highlights

 An ISO 9001:2008 Certified Institution
 Secured 15th Rank in the Anna University Rank List
 Active Member in CSI (Computer Society of India)
 Membership in NASSCOM
 Member in IETE
 Active Member in ICT-ACT
 Member in ISTE (Indian Society for Technical Education)

Campus facilities

Associations

The aim of these associations is to encourage student participation in group discussions and to motivate the members to present papers in conferences and symposia conducted at colleges at the state and national levels. The currently existing associations are:

 Association of Basic Science
 CSI Student Branch
 English Literary Association
 FOSS club
 ISTE Students and Staff Chapter
 IETE Students Chapter

Hostels

The hostel can accommodate about 500 students.

Courses

 B.E. Electronic Communication and Engineering
 B.E. Computer Science and Engineering
 B.E. Electrical and Electronic Engineering
 B.Tech Information Technology

References

Women's engineering colleges in India
Private engineering colleges in Tamil Nadu
Women's universities and colleges in Tamil Nadu
Colleges affiliated to Anna University
Education in Virudhunagar district